Edward Garfield Hilley (June 17, 1879 – November 14, 1956), nicknamed "Whitey", was an American Major League Baseball third baseman. He played for the Philadelphia Athletics during the  season.

References

Major League Baseball third basemen
Philadelphia Athletics players
Baseball players from Ohio
1879 births
1956 deaths
Cleveland Lake Shores players
Troy Washerwomen players
Troy Trojans (minor league) players
Utica Pent-Ups players
Amsterdam-Gloversville-Johnstown Hyphens players
Amsterdam-Gloversville-Johnstown Jags players
Youngstown Ohio Works players
Montgomery Senators players
Sharon Giants players
Youngstown Champs players
Uniontown Coal Barons players
Davenport Prodigals players
New Castle Nocks players
Sharon Travelers players